China is the largest producer and consumer of coal and the largest user of coal-generated electricity in the world. The share of coal in the Chinese energy mix declined to 55% in 2021 according to the US Energy Information Agency.

The Chinese central government has clamped down on the pace of new construction of coal plants and shifted to renewable, nuclear and natural gas sources. At the same time, coal consumption reached new heights in China with carbon dioxide emissions from coal-fired electricity production estimated to top 4.5 billion tonnes in 2022. Reuters noted in 2022, "China is set to delight and depress climate trackers in equal measure in 2022 by setting new global records in both clean power utilisation and coal-fired electricity emissions." Solar and wind generated electricity surged by over 30% and 25% respectively during the period from January to October 2022 compared to the same period in 2021. Despite central government attempts to clamp down on construction and shifting demand in the market to renewable, nuclear and natural gas sources, 43 coal power units were announced in the first half of 2021 according to the Centre for Research on Energy and Clean Air in August 2021. 

In September 2021, China pledged to end financing of coal power plants abroad. A study by Centre for Research on Energy and Clean Air in April 2022, stated at least 15 overseas coal power plants had been cancelled since the announcement while 18 projects which had secured financing and necessary permits could enter into construction.

During the 2021 energy crisis in China, this dependency on coal units, depletion of reserves, increasing import prices, and slowdowns of shipment and production lead to widespread shutdowns of industrial energy use.

History

Coal mines in pre-industrial China

Ancient people in current China started using coal around 6 000 years ago. Historians suspects that the Chinese were involved in the surface mining of coal around 3490 BC, pioneering the pre-modern world. Fushan mine uses to be pointed out as the earliest coal mine in the ancient world and started around 1 000 BC. In pre-modern China, coal was constrained both by the limitations of traditional technology and the weakness of demand. 
In the 3rd century BC, Chinese people began burning coal for heat. The spread of coal use was gradual until the late 11th century when a timber shortage in north China produced a fast-paced expansion in coal mining and consumption. In 1000 AD, Chinese mines were ahead of most mining advancements in the world.

Coal mines in China faced similar problems to European ones. Both Chinese and European miners preferred to use drift mines sunk horizontally into the hillside for drainage of water. In the 18th century, British observers realized that such mines in Guangdong were opening out directly on to a river. Slope mines were the second most common type, as mines in Leiyang, Hunan.

In the 19th century, shaft mines were predominant, especially in north China. European observers interpreted that as a consequence of the lack of wood in the zone to hold up the roof in slope mines. Flooding was a constant problem, and several mines were abandoned for that reason.

Coal mines in China were as deep as those in Europe. In areas such as Shanxi with natural drainage, mines were as deep as 120 m. From Henan and Manchuria, mines had depths of 90 m or more.

Early coal consumption in China

Coal consumption in traditional China was substantial but low on a per capita basis. Main coal demand came from industry. The earliest references to coal are in the context of smelting methods. The technology was spread from the central plain to outlying areas in China.

In the 11th century, the iron produced in north China was smelted in coke-burning blast-furnaces. Deforestation in that zone forced to turn to the use of coke, mushrooming ironworking centers along the Henan-Hebei border. Accounts of that period estimate that at least 140 000 tons of coal a year were used by the iron industry in that zone. Chinese scientist Song Yingxing suggested that around 70% of iron was smelted with coal. Meanwhile, 30% used charcoal. Shanxi was the center of the iron industry in late traditional times. German scientist Ferdinand von Richthofen accounted for the use of coal in several areas of the province.

Early descriptions of coal for household purposes go back until the 6th century when a writer pointed out that food tastes different according to whether it was cooked over coal, charcoal, bamboo, or grass. From the 11th century, coal was the main option in the household in the capital at Kaifeng. At the beginning of the 12th century, twenty new coal markets were established and coal replaced charcoal in the zone. Increasing demand led to the development of mining in areas of Henan and Shandong. Marco Polo claimed that coal was "burnt through the province of Cathay" and pointed out that was used in bathhouses.

Production

Coalfields
China produces most of the thermal coal (both black and brown coal) it burns, but imports coking coal to make high quality steel. Inner Mongolia, Shanxi and Shaanxi are the main coal-producing provinces, and most coal is found in the north and northwest of the country. This poses a large logistical problem for supplying electricity to the more heavily populated coastal areas in the southeast.

Coal production
China is the largest coal producer in the world, with 3.84 billion tonnes in 2020 and China National Coal Association forecasting an increase in 2021. 
The coal production 1829 Mtoe in 2018 is more than the total aggregate of next nine top coal producers and 46.7% of the total global production.

In 2011, seven Chinese coal mining companies produced 100 million tonnes of coal or more. These companies were Shenhua Group, China Coal Group, Shaanxi Coal and Chemical Industry, Shanxi Coking Coal Group, Datong Coal Mine Group, Jizhong Energy, and Shandong Energy. 
The largest metallurgical coal producer was Shanxi Coking Coal Group.

In 2015, official statistics revealed that previous statistics had been systematically underestimated by 17%, corresponding to the entire  emissions of Germany.

China's largest open-pit coal mine is located in Haerwusu in the Inner Mongolia Autonomous Region. It started production in 2008, and is operated by Shenhua Group. Its estimated coal output was forecast at 7 million tonnes in the fourth quarter of 2008. With a designed annual capacity of 20 million tonnes of crude coal, it will operate for approximately 79 years. Its coal reserves total about 1.73 billion tonnes. It is rich in low-sulfur steam coal.
Mines in Inner Mongolia are rapidly expanding production, with 637 million tons produced in 2009. Transport of coal from this region to seaports on China's coast has overloaded highways such as China National Highway 110 resulting in chronic traffic jams and delays.

In 2021, the government ordered all coal mines to operate at full capacity at all times, including holidays; approved new mines, and reduced restrictions on coal mining.

Imports
China is the world's largest importer of coal: with big imports from Russia and Indonesia in the 2020s. After boycotting Australian coal in 2020, coking coal imports from Mongolia and the US increased.

Use
57% of energy consumption was from coal in 2020, and 49% for coal-fired power. The coal consumption was 1907 Mtoe in 2018 which is 50.2% of the global consumption. The National Development and Reform Commission, which determines the energy policy of China, aims to keep China's coal consumption below 3.8 billion tonnes per annum.

The consumption of coal is largely in power production, aside from this, there is a lot of industry and manufacturing use along with a comparatively very small amount of domestic use in poorer households for heating and cooking.

Electricity generation

Coal power is distributed by the State Power Grid Corporation.

China's installed coal-based electrical capacity was 1080 GW in 2021, about half the total installed capacity. Coal generated 57% of electricity in 2020. Over half the world's coal-fired power is generated in China. 5 GW of new coal power was approved in the first half of 2021. Quotas force utility companies to buy coal power over cheaper renewable power. Carbon Tracker estimated in 2020 that the average coal fleet loss was about 4 USD/MWh and that about 60% of power stations were cashflow negative in 2018 and 2019. 
According to 2020 analysis by Energy Foundation China, to keep warming to 1.5 degrees C all China's coal plants without carbon capture must be phased out by 2045.

Industrial use
One of the principal users is the steel industry in China, which burns metallurgical coal.

Domestic use 

In cities the domestic burning of coal is no longer permitted. In rural areas coal is still permitted to be used by Chinese households, commonly burned raw in unvented stoves. This fills houses with high levels of toxic metals leading to bad indoor air quality (IAQ). In addition, people eat food cooked over coal fires that contains toxic substances. Toxic substances from coal burning include arsenic, fluorine, polycyclic aromatic hydrocarbons, and mercury. These cause health issues such as severe arsenic poisoning, skeletal fluorosis (over 10 million people afflicted in China), esophageal and lung cancers, and selenium poisoning.

China is now aware of the impact of coal on the environment and is taking steps to change it. Currently, China has started to implement natural gas as an alternative to coal for heating. But if rural areas lose government subsidies, no one will continue to use natural gas.

In 2007 the use of coal and biomass (collectively referred to as solid fuels) for domestic purposes was nearly ubiquitous in rural households but declining in urban homes. At that time, estimates put the number of premature deaths due to indoor air pollution at 420,000 per year, which is even higher than due to outdoor air pollution, estimated at around 300,000 deaths per year. The specific mechanisms for death cited have been respiratory illnesses, lung cancer, Chronic Obstructive Pulmonary Disease (COPD), weakening of the immune system, and reduction in lung function. Measured pollution levels in homes using solid fuels generally exceeded China's IAQ air quality standards. Technologies exist to improve indoor air quality, notably the installation of a chimney and modernized bioenergy but need more support to make a larger difference.

Carbon footprint

2019 carbon emissions from coal in China are estimated at 7.24 billion tonnes CO2 emissions, around 14% of the world total greenhouse gas emissions of around 50 billion tonnes. In 2021 the carbon price was about one-tenth of the EU carbon price.

It is believed that a continued increase in coal power in China may undermine international initiatives to decrease carbon emissions, such as the Paris Agreement.

Efforts to reduce emissions

Air pollution in China kills 750,000 people every year, according to a study by the World Bank. Issued in response to record-high levels of air pollution in 2012 and 2013, the State Council's September 2013 Action Plan for the Prevention and Control of Air Pollution reiterated the need to reduce coal's share in China's energy mix to 65% by 2017. Amidst growing public concern, social unrest incidents are growing around the country. For example, in December 2011 the government suspended plans to expand a coal-fired power plant in the city of Haimen after 30,000 local residents staged a violent protest against it, because "the coal-fired power plant was behind a rise in the number of local cancer patients, environmental pollution and a drop in the local fishermen's catch."

In addition to environmental and health costs at home, China's dependence on coal is cause for concern on a global scale. Due in large part to the emissions caused by burning coal, China is now the number one producer of carbon dioxide, responsible for a full quarter of the world's  output. The country has taken steps towards battling climate change by pledging to cut its carbon intensity (the amount of  produced per dollar of economic output) by about 40 percent by 2020, compared to 2005 levels.

China has said carbon dioxide from coal will peak by 2025. On average, China's coal plants work more efficiently than those in the United States, due to their relative youth.

New coal power plants have a set date of the beginning of 2012 and for old power plants by mid-2014. They must also abide by a new limit on mercury by beginning of 2015. It is estimated such measures could bring about a 70% reduction in  emissions from power plants.

The Chinese national carbon trading scheme began in 2021.

Beijing 
China decided to close the last four coal-fired power and heating plants out of Beijing's municipal area, replacing them with gas-fired power plants, in an effort to improve air quality in the capital. The four plants, owned by Huaneng Power International, Datang International Power Generation Co Ltd, China Shenhua Energy and Beijing Jingneng Thermal Power Co Ltd, had a total power generating capacity of about 2.7 gigawatts (GW). All of them have been closed as of March 2019.

Coal mine fires
It is estimated that coal mine fires in China burn about 200 million kg of coal each year. Small illegal fires are frequent in the northern region of Shanxi. Local miners may use abandoned mines for shelter and intentionally set such fires. One study estimates that this translates into 360 million metric tons of carbon dioxide emissions per year, which is not included in the previous emissions figures.

North China's Inner Mongolia Autonomous Region has announced plans to extinguish fires in the region by 2012. Most of these fires were caused by bad mining practices combined with bad weather. 200 million yuan (29.3 million USD) has been budgeted to this effect.

Accidents and deaths 

In 2003, the death rate per million tons of coal mined in China was 130 times higher than in the United States, 250 times higher than in Australia (open cast mines) and 10 times higher than the Russian Federation (underground mines). However the safety figures in the major state owned coal enterprises were significantly better. Even so, in 2007 China produced one third of the world's coal but had four fifths of coal fatalities. China's coal mining industry resorts to forced labor according to a 2014 U.S. Department of Labor report on child labor and forced labor around the world, and that these workers are all the more exposed to the dangers of such activities.

Pulmonary disease
 While not directly attributable, many more deaths are resultant from dangerous emissions from coal plants. Chronic obstructive pulmonary disease (COPD), linked to exposure to fine particulates, SO2, and cigarette smoke among other factors, accounted for 26% of all deaths in China in 1988. A report by the World Bank in cooperation with the Chinese government found that about 750,000 people die prematurely in China each year from air pollution. Later, the government asked the researchers to soften the conclusions.

Many direct deaths happen in coal mining and processing. In 2007, 1,084 out of the 3,770 workers who died were from gas blasts. Small mines (comprising 90% of all mines) are known to have far higher death rates, and the government of China has banned new coal mines with a high gas danger and a capacity below 300,000 tons in an effort to reduce deaths a further 20% by 2010. The government has also vowed to close 4,000 small mines to improve industry safety.

Accidents
As of 2009, the government has been cracking down on unregulated mining operations, which in 2009 accounted for nearly 80 percent of the country's 16,000 mines.
The closure of about 1,000 dangerous small mines in 2008 helped to cut in half the average number of miners killed, to about six a day, in the first six months of 2009, according to the government.
Major gas explosions in coal mines remain a problem, though the number of accidents and deaths have gradually declined year by year, the chief of the State Administration of Work Safety, Luo Lin, told a national conference in September 2009.

In the first nine months of 2009, China's coal mines had eleven major accidents with 303 deaths, with gas explosions the leading cause, according to the central government. Most accidents are blamed on failures to follow safety rules, including a lack of required ventilation or fire control equipment.

Unofficial estimates often estimate death tolls at twice the official number reported by the government. Since 1949 over 250,000 coal mining deaths have been recorded. However, since 2002, the death toll is gradually declining while the coal production is rapidly rising, doubling over this same period.

By year

Source: State Administration of Work Safety

Technology export
 China is exporting technology, for example for coal mining in Turkey.

Just transition to phase out coal

According to BloombergNEF excluding subsidies the levelized cost of electricity from new large-scale solar power has been below existing coal-fired power stations since 2021. Coal production employed 2.6 million in 2020 so a just transition is important, but renewable energy creates more jobs per yuan invested. Almost half of tax revenue in Shanxi province is from coal. Energy storage and demand response are important for replacing coal generation. In 2020 a group of experts said that China should stop subsidizing coal.

International opinions

In 2020 UN secretary general António Guterres said that China should stop building coal-fired power stations, and such building was criticized by US climate envoy John Kerry in 2021 as making it difficult to limit climate change.

See also 

 :Category:Coal companies of China
 Asian brown cloud
 Clean coal technology
Other countries
 Coal mining in Canada
 Coal in the United States

References

Further reading

External links

Organizations

Institute of Coal Chemistry

 
Climate change in China
Mining in China